Guryevsk is the name of several urban localities in Russia:
Guryevsk, Kaliningrad Oblast, a town in Guryevsky District of Kaliningrad Oblast
Guryevsk, Kemerovo Oblast, a town in Kemerovo Oblast